The following is a list of notable people from San Bernardino, California.

Arts
 Jerome Bixby – Writer
 Gene Hackman – actor
 Kirk Harris – actor, writer
 Edith Head – costume designer
 Poison Ivy – producer and guitarist for the Cramps
 Brenden Jefferson – actor
 Roscoe Karns (1891–1970) – actor
 David Lauser – drummer
 Julie London – singer, actress
 Michael Reaves – screenwriter
 Lakeith Stanfield – actor
 Moses Sumney – singer-songwriter
 Philip Michael Thomas – actor
 Jason Thornberry - writer, musician
 Miranda Weese – dancer
 Jefferson Wood – illustrator
 Shailene Woodley – actress

Journalism

 Ron Magers – reporter and news anchor at WLS-TV in Chicago
 Wilbur H. Durborough (1882-1946) – photojournalist and film correspondent in World War I
 Henry L. Hooks (1921-2021)-first photojournalist in the IE to have African-American photos published in the San Bernardino Sun Telegram

Politics
 Anna Escobedo Cabral – 42nd Treasurer of the United States
 Stephen W. Cunningham – first UCLA graduate manager and Los Angeles City Council member, 1933–41
 Merritt B. Curtis – Brigadier General in the Marine Corps and candidate for President of the United States in 1960
 Dirk Kempthorne – Idaho Governor, U.S. Senator, U.S. Secretary of the Interior; moved to San Bernardino at a young age, lived there through junior college
 Claude R. Kirk, Jr. – Governor of Florida

Science

 Michael R. Clifford – astronaut
 Howard Georgi – professor of physics at Harvard University

Sports
 Tyler Ankrum – NASCAR driver
 Glenn Braggs – professional baseball player, Milwaukee Brewers and Cincinnati Reds
 Branden Becker – professional baseball player, Baltimore Orioles 
 Greg Bunch – basketball player
 Brandie Burton – professional golfer
 Chuck Carr – professional baseball player, New York Mets, St. Louis Cardinals, Florida Marlins, Milwaukee Brewers, and Houston Astros
 Layshia Clarendon – professional basketball player, Indiana Fever
 Kenny Clark – National Football League player, Green Bay Packers
 Mark Collins – National Football League player, New York Giants, Kansas City Chiefs, Green Bay Packers, two-time Super Bowl winner
 Rich Dauer – professional baseball player
 Shawn Estes – professional baseball player
 Bobby Green - UFC Fighter
 Charles Johnson – National Football League player
 Al Jury – National Football League referee
 Damontae Kazee – professional National Football League player, Atlanta Falcons
 Bob Lemon - professional baseball player and manager of NY Yankees
 Paul Lim – professional darts player
 Alberto Madril – professional wrestler
Alexander Mattison – professional football player for the Minnesota Vikings
 Jason Moore – National Football League player
 Ryan Nece – National Football League player, Tampa Bay Buccaneers
 Craig Newsome – National Football League player, Green Bay Packers and San Francisco 49ers
 Derek Parra – speed skater, gold and silver medalist at 2002 Winter Olympics, competed at the 2006 Winter Olympics
 Stephanie Rehe – Women's Tennis Association player, ranked No. 10 in singles in March 1989
Ricky Romero – Latino wrestler
 Bryon Russell – professional basketball player, Denver Nuggets, Utah Jazz, and Los Angeles Lakers
 Swede Savage – Indy 500, sports car, and NASCAR driver; died in 1973 Indy 500
 Daryl Sconiers – professional baseball player
 Judy Shapiro-Ikenberry (born 1942) - long distance runner
 Jeremy Stevenson – NHL player; born in San Bernardino
 Dave Stockton – professional golfer, two-time PGA Championship winner
 Jalin Turner – mixed martial artist
Lisa Marie Varon – retired WWE professional wrestler known as Victoria, former two-time holder of the WWE Women's Championship (1956-2010)
 Charlie Venegas – professional speedway rider and two-time world champion, four-time ice racing world champion

Other
Anthony Acevedo (1924–2018) – Mexican-American engineer and U.S. soldier incarcerated at the Berga concentration camp during World WarII
John Brown (1817-1889) - Mountain man, fur trapper and trader, prominent businessman in San Bernardino. 
Richard and Maurice McDonald - founders of McDonald's
 iDubbbz, YouTuber
Anna Nieto-Gómez – Chicana feminist
Rizwan Farook, worked as a health inspector and was a criminal

References

San Bernardino, California
San Bernardino